Woman Searching for Fleas (Italian - Cercatrice di pulci), The Flea (La pulce) or Woman Getting out of Bed (Donna che si alza dal letto) is a 1710-1730 oil on copper painting by Giuseppe Maria Crespi, a painter from Bologna. The main version is now in the collection of the Uffizi in Florence, whilst variants survive, including one at the Museo nazionale di palazzo Reale in Pisa, also originating in the Guardaroba of the Grand Dukes of Tuscany.

Art critics are uncertain whether the work is a single one or - as asserted by Longhi - one in a series of oil on copper works showing scenes from everyday life.

Display history
 Mostra del Settecento bolognese, Bologna, 1935
 Mostra celebrativa di Giuseppe Maria Crespi, Bologna, 1948
 Artisti alla corte granducale, Firenze, 1969
 Giuseppe Maria Crespi nei Musei fiorentini, Firenze, 1993

References

Bibliography
  Mostra del Settecento bolognese: catalogo. Bologna, Palazzo comunale, Bologna, Coop. tip. Mareggiani, 1935, SBN IT\ICCU\RAV\0023805.
  M. Chiarini, Artisti alla corte granducale: Palazzo Pitti, Appartamenti monumentali, maggio-luglio 1969, Firenze, Centro Di, 1969, SBN IT\ICCU\SBL\0100792.
  Gallerie degli Uffizi, Gli Uffizi: Catalogo generale, Firenze, Centro Di, 1980, p. 233 [1979], SBN IT\ICCU\RAV\0060995.
  Mira Pajes Merriman, Giuseppe Maria Crespi, Milano, Rizzoli, 1980, SBN IT\ICCU\RAV\0188059.
  Andrea Emiliani (ed.), Giuseppe Maria Crespi, 1665-1747, Bologna, Credito romagnolo-Nuova Alfa editoriale, 1990, SBN IT\ICCU\UBO\0084603.
  Giuseppe Maria Crespi nei Musei fiorentini: Firenze, Uffizi, Sala delle Reali poste, 3 giugno-1 agosto 1993, Firenze, Centro Di, 1993, SBN IT\ICCU\VEA\0053000.

Paintings in the collection of the Uffizi
Paintings in Pisa
Genre paintings
1710s paintings
1720s paintings